Martyniaceae is a family of flowering plants in the Lamiales order that are restricted to the Americas.  The family was included in Pedaliaceae in the Cronquist system (under order Scrophulariales) but is recognized as a separate family by the Angiosperm Phylogeny Group on the basis of phylogenetic studies that show that the two families are not closely related.  Both families are characterized by having mucilaginous hairs — which give the stems and leaves a slimy or clammy feel — and fruits with hooks or horns. Some members of the genus Proboscidea are known as "unicorn plant" or "devil's claw" because of their horned seed capsules.

Genera
 Craniolaria
 Holoregmia
 Ibicella
 Martynia
 Proboscidea

References

External links
 Martyniaceae

 
Lamiales families